Philip Edward Smith (January 1, 1884 – December 8, 1970) was an American endocrinologist who is best known for his work studying the pituitary gland.
He developed methods for removing pituitary glands from tadpoles and rats and showed that such removal resulted in cessation of growth, and atrophy of other endocrine glands such as the adrenal cortex and the reproductive organs.  After graduating with a PhD in Anatomy from Cornell University in 1912, he joined the Department of Anatomy, Berkeley California until 1926. From 1927 to 1952 he served as Professor of Anatomy at the College of Physicians and Surgeons at Columbia University. He became a research associate at Stanford University, where he published his last paper in 1963.

Works include
"Hypophysectomy and Replacement Therapy in the rat"
"The disabilities caused by hypophysectomy and their repair"

References

Severinghaus AE, "A memorial resolution for Philip Edward Smith" Am J Anat. 1972 Oct;135(2):159-64
Agate FJ Sr, "Philip Edward Smith. 1884–1970" Anat Rec. 1971 Sep;171(1):134-6.
Christy NP, "Philip Edward Smith PhD. (1884–1970)" Endocrinology. 1972 Jun;90(6):1415-6.

1884 births
1970 deaths
American endocrinologists
Cornell University alumni
Cornell University faculty
People from De Smet, South Dakota
Pomona College alumni